Ardonea morio is a moth of the subfamily Arctiinae. It was described by Francis Walker in 1854. It is found in Mexico, Guatemala, Honduras, Panama, Colombia and Venezuela.

References

Moths described in 1854
Lithosiini
Moths of North America
Moths of South America